Evelyn Hoskins (born 13 May 1988) is an English actress best known for her role as Shona Wark in the British BBC1 hospital drama series Casualty.

Evelyn's other television appearances include an appearance in Holby City, also as Shona Wark, and a part in the E4 comedy drama Misfits in which she appears as Lucy, a shape-shifter.

Education and career 
Evelyn attended Arts University Bournemouth where she graduated with a BA (Hons).

Evelyn's stage debut came playing the part of Thea in Spring Awakening at the Lyric Hammersmith Theatre on 23 January 2009. Evelyn's other stage appearances include the role of Martha in The Secret Garden at Birmingham Rep and Piper in The Light Princess at The National Theatre Studio.

Evelyn played the role of "Nicky" in the 2014 touring production of This Is My Family.

Hoskins has previously played Carrie White in the Southwark Playhouse's production of Carrie.

Hoskins also played Cecile Caldwell in Cruel Intentions at the Edinburgh Fringe Festival 2019.

Hoskins was engaged to Gavin and Stacey actor, Mathew Horne until 2018.

Hoskins' played the role of Dawn in Waitress at the Adelphi Theatre from 27 January 2020 until 14 March 2020. Her run in the show was cut short as a result of the COVID-19 pandemic, which forced Waitress to close on 14 March 2020. She recently reprised the role of Dawn in the Waitress UK tour with Jenna being played by Lucie Jones until January 2022 then Chelsea Halfpenny thereafter. Sandra Marvin is also cast as Becky with Matt Willis as Dr Pomatter. The tour finished on 20 August 2022 at Theatre Royal, Norwich.

Stage work

Television appearances

References 

1988 births
English television actresses
Living people
Alumni of Arts University Bournemouth
English musical theatre actresses